The 2006 NCAA Division I FCS football season, the 2006 season of college football for teams in the Football Championship Subdivision (FCS), began on August 26, 2006 and concluded on December 15, 2006, in Chattanooga, Tennessee, at the 2006 NCAA Division I Football Championship Game where the Appalachian State Mountaineers defeated the UMass Minutemen, 28–17.

Rule changes
There are several rules that have changed for the 2006 season. Following are some highlights:

Players may only wear clear eyeshields. Previously, both tinted and orange were also allowed.
The kicking tee has been lowered from two inches tall to only one inch.
Halftime lasts twenty minutes. Previously, it was only fifteen minutes.
On a kickoff, the game clock starts when the ball is kicked rather than when the receiving team touches it.
 This rule change has resulted in controversy, highlighted by the matchup between Wisconsin and Penn State on November 4, 2006, in which Wisconsin deliberately went off-sides on two consecutive kickoffs to run extra time off the clock at the close of the first half.
 On a change of possession, the clock starts when the referee marks the ball ready for play, instead of on the snap.
The referee may no longer stop the game due to excessive crowd noise.
When a live-ball penalty such as an illegal formation occurs on a kick, the receiving team may choose either to add the penalty yardage to the end of the return or require the kick to be attempted again with the spot moved back. Previously, only the latter option was available.
If a team scores at the end of the game, they will not kick the extra point unless it would affect the outcome of the game.
Instant replay is now officially sanctioned and standardized. All plays are reviewed by the replay officials as the play occurs. They may call down to the on-field officials to stop play if they need extra time to make a review. Each coach may also make one challenge per game. In the case of a coach's challenge, the coach must have at least one time-out remaining. If the challenge is upheld the coach gets the time-out back but the challenge is spent. If the challenge is rejected, both the challenge and the time-out are spent.

Conference changes and new programs

FCS team wins over FBS teams
September 2 – Montana State 19, Colorado 10
September 2 – Portland State 17 New Mexico 7
September 2 – Richmond 13, Duke 0
September 9 – New Hampshire 34, Northwestern 17
September 16 – Southern Illinois 35, Indiana 28
September 23 – North Dakota State 29, Ball State 24
October 28 - Cal Poly SLO 16, San Diego State 14

Conference standings

Conference champions

Automatic berths

Invitation

Abstains

Postseason

NCAA Division I playoff bracket

* Host institution

SWAC Championship Game

Gridiron Classic

The Gridiron Classic is an annual game between the champions of the Northeast Conference and the Pioneer Football League that has been held since December 2006.

Final poll standings

Standings are from The Sports Network final 2006 poll.

References

External links